Dr. Abdulwahab Abdo Raweh (born in 1952) is an active Yemeni politician and was in the Yemeni cabinets (1994 through 2006). He has been in the cabinets of Abdul Aziz Abdul Ghani (1994–1997), Faraj Said Bin Ghanem (1997–1998), Abdul Karim al-Iryani (1998–2001), and Abdul Qadir Bajamal (2001–2006).
In 2006, he became the president of Aden University in Yemen until 15 June 2008, when he was elected in the Shoora Council of Yemen.

Political career

Dr. Abdulwahab Raweh held posts as Minister of Youth and Sports (1994–2001), Minister of Civil Services and Insurance (4 April 2001 – 2003), and Minister of Higher Education and Scientific Research (2003–2006).

Other activities

On 13 November 2006 he was elected the president of Al-Telal club.

Background and Private life
Dr. Abdulwahab Raweh was born in mount Saber in Taiz city. He studied Arabic literature in Sana'a and traveled to Egypt where he obtained his Master and Ph.D. degrees. He went back to Yemen and taught Arabic Literature in the faculty of Art at Sana'a university. A year later, he became the vice dean of the same faculty he taught in. Years Later he became the dean of the faculty of higher education after which he became the  minister of Youth and Sports.

Dr. Abdulwahab Raweh is married and has two sons, Ayman and Haitham.

External links
 When Dr. Abdulwahab was appointed the Minister of Insurance and Civil Services on April 4, 2001
 Some news about Dr. Abdulwahab Raweh when he was Youth and Sports Minister
 News about Dr. Abdulwahab Raweh when he was the Minister of Civil Service
 News about Dr. Abdulwahab Raweh when he was the Minister of Higher Education and Scientific Research
 Interview with Dr. Raweh on May 22 Newspaper, Arabic
 Dr. Raweh elected to the Shoora Council of Yemen, Arabic
 Dr. Raweh Farewell in Aden University, Arabic

1952 births
Living people
General People's Congress (Yemen) politicians
Academic staff of the University of Aden
Academic staff of Sanaa University
Youth and Sports ministers of Yemen
Civil Service ministers of Yemen
21st-century Yemeni politicians
Higher education ministers of Yemen